Sportverein 19 Straelen e.V., commonly known as simply SV 19 Straelen or SV Straelen, is a German association football club from Straelen, North Rhine-Westphalia. The club was established in 1919 and today has nearly 2,400 members with departments for athletics, badminton, basketball, gymnastics, handball, karate, swimming, and volleyball.



History
Long an unheralded local side, Sportverein Straelen first won promotion to the fourth tier Oberliga Nordrhein in 1996. The team finished just inside the relegation zone the following season, but avoided being sent down when the second team side of KFC Uerdingen, which had finished ahead of SV, folded due to the loss of the club's sponsor. After their retrieve, Straelen had a three-year stay at the Oberliga level that ended with a 17th-place finish in 2001. During this period the team earned an appearance in the opening round of the DFB-Pokal (German Cup) following a 1999 regional cup win.

SV returned to the Oberliga Nordrhein (IV) in 2006 on the strength of a Verbandsliga Niederrhein (V) title. In 2007–08, the club clearly missed the qualifying criteria for the new Oberliga Nordrhein-Westfalen, coming last in the league. In an odd twist, while the first team was relegated to the Verbandsliga, the reserve team achieved promotion from the Landesliga at the same time. For this reason, the club fields both teams in the same league in the 2008–09 season, a novelty at this level of play.

They were promoted to the Regionalliga West after winning the Oberliga Niederrhein in 2017–18, but were relegated the following season. They returned to the Regionalliga in 2020.

Honours
The club's honours:
 Oberliga Niederrhein
 Champions (V): 2017–18
 Champions (V): 2019–20
 Verbandsliga Niederrhein
 Champions (V): 1995–96, 2005–06
 Landesliga Niederrhein 2
 Champions (V): 1982–83, 1993–94
 Lower Rhine Cup 
 Winners: 2022

Stadium
SV Straelen play their home fixtures at Sportplatz Römerstraße, which has a seating area and general admission grandstand with a capacity of 2,300.

Players

Current squad

References

External links
Official team site
Das deutsche Fußball-Archiv historical German domestic league tables 

Football clubs in Germany
Football clubs in North Rhine-Westphalia
Association football clubs established in 1919
1919 establishments in Germany